= Kumarapediya =

Town in Sri Lanka

Coordinates: 7°23′00″N 80°18′00″E

Kumarapediya is a town located in the North Western Province of Sri Lanka at an altitude of 148 metres (488 feet).
